The Story So Far is the sole studio album by English band Mo-dettes, released in 1980 by record label Deram. It was re-released by Cherry Red Records in 2008 with bonus tracks.

Track listing
All tracks composed by Mo-dettes; except where indicated
"Fandango"
"Satisfy"
"Dark Park Creeping"
"The Kray Twins"
"Paint It Black" (Mick Jagger, Keith Richards; arranged by Mo-dettes)
"White Mouse Disco"
"Bedtime Stories"
"Masochistic Opposite"
"Foolish Girl"
"Norman (He's a Rebel)"
"Sparrow"
"Mi'Lord" (Mustacchi Joseph, Monnot Margueritte Angele)

2008 Bonus Tracks
"Bitta Truth"
"Two Can Play"
"Tonight" (Lee Hazlewood)
"Waltz in Blue Minor"
"White Mice"

Personnel
Mo-dettes
Ramona Carlier - vocals
Kate Corris - guitar
Jane Crockford - bass
June Miles-Kingston - drums

References

External links 
 

1980 debut albums
Deram Records albums